François Auguste Ferdinand Mariette (11 February 182118 January 1881) was a French scholar, archaeologist and Egyptologist, and the founder of the Egyptian Department of Antiquities, the forerunner of the Supreme Council of Antiquities.

Early career
Auguste Mariette was born in Boulogne-sur-Mer, where his father was town clerk. Educated at the Boulogne municipal college, where he distinguished himself and showed much artistic talent, he went to England in 1839 when eighteen as professor of French and drawing at a boys' school at Stratford-upon-Avon. In 1840 he became pattern-designer to a ribbon manufacturer in Coventry, but he returned the same year to Boulogne, and in 1841 took a degree at the University of Douai. Mariette proved to be a talented draftsman and designer, and he supplemented his salary as a teacher at Douai by giving private lessons and writing on historical and archaeological subjects for local periodicals.

Meanwhile, his cousin Nestor L'Hôte, the friend and fellow-traveller of Champollion, died, and the task of sorting his papers filled Mariette with a passion for Egyptology. Largely self-taught, he devoted himself to the study of hieroglyphs and Coptic. His 1847 analytic catalogue of the Egyptian Gallery of the Boulogne Museum got him a minor appointment at the Louvre Museum in 1849.

He was elected as a member of the American Philosophical Society in 1869.

First trip to Egypt

Entrusted with a government mission for the purpose of seeking and purchasing the best Coptic, Syriac, Arabic and Ethiopic manuscripts for the Louvre collection so that it retained its then-supremacy over other national collections, he set out for Egypt in 1850.

After little success in acquiring manuscripts due to inexperience, to avoid an embarrassing return empty-handed to France and wasting what might be his only trip to Egypt, he visited temples and befriended a Bedouin tribe, who led him to Saqqara. The site initially looked "a spectacle of desolation...[and] mounds of sand" (his words), but on noticing one sphinx from the reputed avenue of sphinxes, that led to the ruins of the Serapeum of Saqqara near the step-pyramid, with its head above the sands, he gathered 30 workmen. Thus, in 1851, he made his celebrated discovery of this avenue and eventually the subterranean tomb-temple complex of catacombs with their spectacular sarcophagi of the Apis bulls. Breaking through the rubble at the tomb entrance on November 12, he entered the complex, finding thousands of  statues, bronze tablets and other treasures, but only one intact sarcophagus. He also found the virtually intact tomb of Prince Khaemweset, Ramesses II's son.

Accused of theft and destruction by rival diggers and by the Egyptian authorities, Mariette began to rebury his finds in the desert to keep them from these competitors. Instead of manuscripts, official French funds were now advanced for the prosecution of his researches, and he remained in Egypt for four years, excavating, discovering and despatching archaeological treasures to the Louvre, following the accepted Eurocentric convention. However, the French government and the Louvre set up an arrangement to divide the finds 50:50, so that upon his return to Paris 230 crates went to the Louvre (and he was raised to an assistant conservator), but an equal amount remained in Egypt.

Director of Antiquities

After his discoveries at Saqqara, Mariette could not be content with a purely academic role. He said: "I knew I would die or go mad if I did not return to Egypt immediately" and, after less than a year, he returned to Egypt at the insistence of the Egyptian government under Sa'id of Egypt, who created the position of Conservator of Egyptian monuments for him, in 1858.

Moving with his family to Cairo, Mariette's career blossomed into a chronicle of unwearying exploration and brilliant successes: 
gaining government funds open the museum in Cairo at Bulaq in 1863 in order to take the pressure off the sites and stop the trade in illicit antiquities.
the pyramid-fields of Memphis and (exploiting his previous success to find a cache of ca. 2000BC painted wooden statues such as the Seated Scribe) the tombs of Saqqara
the necropolis of Meidum, and those of Abydos and Thebes
the great temples of Dendera and Edfu were disinterred
important excavations were carried out at Karnak (marking the first full Egyptian use of the stratigraphic methods first developed by Karl Richard Lepsius and of photographing every object prior to its excavation), Medinet-Habu and Deir el-Bahri
Tanis (the Egyptian capital in the Late Period) was partially explored in the Delta
even Gebel Barkal in Sudan was explored
He cleared the sands around the Sphinx down to the bare rock, and in the process discovered the famous granite and alabaster monument, the "Temple of the Sphinx".

In 1860 alone, Mariette set up 35 new dig sites, whilst attempting to conserve already-dug sites.  His success was aided by the fact that no rivals were permitted to dig in Egypt, a fact that the British (who had previously had the majority of Egyptologists active in the country) and Germans (who were politically allied with the country's Ottoman rulers) protested at as a 'sweetheart deal' between Egypt and France.  Nor were Mariette's relations with the Khedive always stable.  The Khedive, like many potentates, assumed all discoveries ranked as treasure and that what went to the museum in Cairo went only at his pleasure.  Even early on, in February 1859, Mariette dashed to Thebes to confiscate a boatload of antiquities from the nearby tomb of Queen Ahhotep I that were to have been sent to the Khedive.

In his position as Director of the Antiquities Service Mariette made concerted efforts to stifle the careers of Egyptians such as Ahmad Kamal within the Service. Heinrich Brugsch, a German philologist documented how Mariette was suspicious of Egyptians and forbade Egyptians from copying hieroglyphs in the Cairo Museum. Mariette was concerned, Brugsch states, that Egyptians might be appointed into official positions within the Museum and was dedicated to stopping that from occurring.

In 1867, he returned to oversee the ancient Egyptian stand at the Exposition Universelle, to a hero's welcome for keeping France pre-eminent in Egyptology.  In 1869, at the request of the Khedive, he wrote a brief plot for an opera. The following year this concept, worked into a scenario by Camille du Locle, was proposed to Giuseppe Verdi, who accepted it as a subject for Aida. For Aida, Mariette and Du Locle oversaw the scenery and costumes, which were inspired by the art of Ancient Egypt. The premiere of Aida was originally scheduled for February 1871, but was delayed until 24 December 1871, due to the siege of Paris at the height of the Franco-Prussian War (which trapped Mariette with the costumes and scenery in Paris). The opera met with great acclaim.

Mariette was raised successively to the rank of bey and pasha, and European honors and orders were bestowed on him.

In 1878, his museum was ravaged by floods, which destroyed most of his notes and drawings. By the spring of 1881, prematurely aged and nearly blind, Mariette arranged for the appointment of the Frenchman Gaston Maspero (a linguist rather than an archaeologist, who he had met at the Exposition in 1867), to ensure that France retained its supremacy in Egyptology in Egypt, rather than an Englishman.

Death

He died in Cairo and was interred in a sarcophagus which is on display in the Garden of the Egyptian Museum, Cairo.

The bust of other famous Egyptologists, including Charles Wycliffe Goodwin, have been placed on a semi-circular memorial around the sarcophagus.

List of selected publications 

Though not all his discoveries were thoroughly published, the list of his publications is a long one.

Publications
Mariette, Auguste. 1857. (Le) Sérapéum de Memphis. Paris: Gide.
Mariette, Auguste. 1875. Karnak: étude topographique et archéologique avec un appendice comprenant les principaux textes hiéroglyphiques découverts ou recueillis pendant les fouilles exécutées à Karnak. Leipzig: J.C. Hinrichs.

Mariette, Auguste. 1880. Catalogue général des monuments d'Abydos découverts pendant les fouilles de cette ville. Paris: L'imprimerie nationale.
Mariette, Auguste. [1888] 1976. Les mastabas de l'ancien empire: Fragment du dernier ouvrage de Auguste Édouard Mariette. G. Olms. 
Mariette, Auguste. 1890. The monuments of Upper Egypt. Boston: H. Mansfield & J.W. Dearborn.
Mariette, Auguste. 1892. Outlines of Ancient Egyptian History. New York: C. Scribner's Sons.
Mariette, Auguste. 1981. Monuments divers recueillis en Egypte et en Nubie. LTR-Verlag. 
Mariette, Auguste. 1999. Voyage dans la Haute-Egypte: Compris entre Le Caire et la première cataracte. Errance.

Notes

References

Further reading
 Auguste Mariette by Amandine Marshall, 2010

See also
 Suez Canal Company

External links

 The Monuments of Upper Egypt, 1877: (excerpt: discovery of the Serapeum, in English)
 Mariette and the Serapeum at Saqqara
 The monuments of Upper Egypt by Mariette.
 Denderah, 1870-74, by Mariette
 Section on Mariette in Archaeologists: Explorers of the Human Past, by Brian Fagan, 2003
 Works by Mariette on the Internet Archive

1821 births
1881 deaths
19th-century French archaeologists
People from Boulogne-sur-Mer
French Egyptologists
Members of the Académie des Inscriptions et Belles-Lettres
Egyptian Museum
Tanis